Winston Vassel Jones (born 13 December 1917) is a Jamaican politician, born in Prattville, Manchester, Jamaica. He was member of the House of Representatives of Jamaica for Manchester Southern from 1955 to 1980. President of the Senate of Jamaica from 1993 to 1995.

Legacy 

 Winston Jones High School

See also
List of presidents of the Senate of Jamaica

References

1917 births
Year of death unknown
Members of the Senate of Jamaica

Members of the House of Representatives of Jamaica